Ciclazindol (WY-23409) is an antidepressant and anorectic drug of the tetracyclic chemical class that was developed in the mid to late 1970s, but was never marketed. It acts as a norepinephrine reuptake inhibitor, and to a lesser extent as a dopamine reuptake inhibitor. Ciclazindol has no effects on the SERT, 5-HT receptors, mACh receptors, or α-adrenergic receptors, and has only weak affinity for the H1 receptor. As suggested by its local anesthetic properties, ciclazindol may also inhibit sodium channels. It is known to block potassium channels as well.

See also 
 Mazindol
 Setazindol

References 

Tertiary alcohols
Anorectics
Norepinephrine reuptake inhibitors
Chloroarenes